Ricardo Filipe da Silva Braga  (born 3 September 1985), best known as Ricardinho, is a Portuguese professional futsal player who plays for Indonesian club Pendekar United. He is regarded by many as the best futsal player of all time, winning numerous titles and accolades for both club and country, such as the UEFA Futsal Champions League, UEFA European Futsal Championship, FIFA Futsal World Cup, the Best Player of the World awards, and many more. He operates mainly as a flank/winger, and commonly wears his iconic number "10".

Nicknamed O Mágico (The Magician), he was named Best Player of the World a record six times by Futsal Planet in 2010, 2014, 2015, 2016, 2017 and 2018. Ricardinho is the only player to have won the award more than four times, being the only Portuguese player to receive it. In 2020 he was awarded a spot in the FutsalFeed's Best Team of the Year Award, the first time this award was conceived.

At international club level, Ricardinho has won the UEFA Futsal Cup, now known as the UEFA Futsal Champions League, thrice, in 2009–10 with Benfica and in 2016–17 and 2017–18 with Inter FS. As a teenager he had already played and lost a final in 2003–04, for Benfica, against Boomerang Interviú. He also lost another final, while at Inter FS, in 2015–16, against Gazprom-Ugra. In European competitions with his country, he won the UEFA Futsal Euro 2018, in which he finished as top scorer and received the award for Best Player. He had already been named the Best Player in the 2007 edition and been joint-top scorer in the 2016 edition. He is now the all-time top scorer of the competition.

In 2021, right after his last FIFA Futsal World Cup match, Ricardinho was awarded with the Golden Ball for the best player throughout the tournament,
 adding another individual achievement to his World Cup Golden Shoe award for top scorer that he had been awarded with the previous edition in 2016. This distinction was strongly associated with his contributions to help Portugal win the 2021 World Cup. Ricardinho captained his Portuguese national team to the first two of their back-to-back-to-back international trophies during the late 2010s and early 2020s, the country's first major honors: the UEFA Futsal Euro 2018 and the 2021 FIFA Futsal World Cup.

Ricardinho is lauded by his defensive quality and workrate, which is very uncommon for a player of such significant offensive prowess, making him very well-rounded. For all his achievements and quality displays, he has been regarded by some experts as the greatest futsal player of all time.

Honours
Benfica
Liga Portuguesa: 2004–05, 2006–07, 2007–08, 2008–09, 2011–12
Taça de Portugal: 2004–05, 2006–07, 2008–09, 2011–12
Supertaça de Portugal: 2006, 2007, 2009
UEFA Futsal Cup: 2009–10

Nagoya Oceans
F. League: 2010–11, 2012–13
F. League Ocean Cup: 2010, 2012

Inter Movistar
Primera División: 2013–14, 2014–15, 2015–16, 2016–17, 2017–18, 2019–20
Copa de España: 2014, 2016, 2017
Copa del Rey: 2014–15
Supercopa de España: 2015, 2017, 2018
UEFA Futsal Cup: 2016–17, 2017–18

ACCS Asnières Villeneuve 92
Championnat de France de Futsal: 2020–21
Championnat de France de Futsal Division 2: 2021–22

Portugal
Futsal Mundialito: 2007
UEFA Futsal Championship: 2018
FIFA Futsal World Cup: 2021

Individual
Best Player of the World: 2010, 2014, 2015, 2016, 2017, 2018
Liga Portuguesa Best Player: 2006–07
Liga Portuguesa Top scorer: 2006–07 (49 goals)
Liga Portuguesa Best Young Player: 2002–03
F. League Best Player: 2010–11
Primera División de Futsal Best Player: 2013–14, 2014–15
Copa de España Best Player: 2014
UEFA Futsal Championship Best Player: 2007, 2018
UEFA Futsal Championship Top Scorer: 2016 (6 goals, shared), 2018 (7 goals)
FIFA Futsal World Cup Best Player: 2021
FIFA Futsal World Cup Golden Shoe: 2016
FIFA Futsal World Cup Bronze Ball: 2012
Best Team of the Year Winger: 2020

Orders
  Commander of the Order of Prince Henry
  Commander of the Order of Merit

References

External links
 
 National team data 
 Expresso interview 

1985 births
Living people
People from Gondomar, Portugal
Portuguese men's futsal players
Futsal forwards
S.L. Benfica futsal players
Nagoya Oceans players
Inter FS players
Portuguese expatriate sportspeople in Japan
Portuguese expatriate sportspeople in Russia
Portuguese expatriate sportspeople in Spain
Sportspeople from Porto District
Portuguese expatriate sportspeople in France
Portuguese expatriate sportspeople in Indonesia